The European professional basketball club rankings are determined by the results of the professional basketball clubs in the EuroLeague and the EuroCup over the previous three seasons, excluding the competition's qualifying rounds. This ranking is exhaustive and does not include all the European club as it is based on closed ligue participation. The FIBA proposes its own alternative rankings.

The clubs receive two points for a win and one point for a loss, in games of the main stages (and onwards) of the EuroLeague and the EuroCup. Qualifying round results are not taken into account. Clubs also receive 2 bonus points for reaching the Top 16 stage of the EuroCup, 2 bonus points for reaching the last 8 stage, one bonus point for reaching the last 4 stage, and 1 bonus point for reaching the Finals.   

In case of a tie, the club with more wins in the last three seasons will rank higher. Should a tie persist, the ranking in the last EuroLeague or EuroCup season will determine the positions.

Current ranking
The top clubs in the current rankings are as follows (updated to 17th March 2023):

*The four Russian teams were suspended in season 2021-22 because of the 2022 Russian invasion of Ukraine. As the Russian invasion of Ukraine did not cease, the records of all regular season matches against Russian teams in Euroleague and Eurocup were annulled.

Top club by period
The top-ranked clubs in each 3-year period listed by year:

See also
 EuroLeague
 EuroCup Basketball
 Basketball Champions League rankings

References

External links
 
 
 
 European Basketball Results Rankings 1957–2007 
 GigaBasket.org 2016 Country League Ranking
 2014/15 EuroLeague Country Ranking
 In-The-Game.org Domestic Rankings

EuroLeague statistics
EuroCup Basketball
Basketball in Europe
Basketball rankings